Abdel-Majed Abdel Bary (born 16 June 1991) is a British former rapper and Islamist militant from Maida Vale, West London. He is the son of Adel Abdel Bari.

After circulation of video footage related to the decapitation of the American journalist James Foley, British intelligence reportedly centred on three suspects who might be the militant in the footage dubbed "Jihadi John", putting a knife to Foley's throat and later on boasting of having undertaken his beheading.

Abdel Bary attained considerable notoriety as he emerged as a prime suspect in the hunt for "Jihadi John", but in February 2015, it was reported that the executioner was Londoner Mohammed Emwazi.

During his ISIS activities Bary posed with a severed head and declared war on the West.

Father
Abdel-Majed Abdel Bary is the son of Ragaa and Adel Abdel Bari. His father was arrested when Abdel-Majed Abdel Bary was six years old. His father was reportedly tortured in Egypt as a suspected radical Islamist. After release, he moved to the United Kingdom where he applied for political asylum with his wife and family.

After a very long process of investigation, with the possible returning of Adel Abdel Bari to Egypt, he was extradited eventually by the British authorities to the United States in 2012 for involvement in the 1998 United States embassy bombings in Kenya and Tanzania and for having alleged links and a longtime association with Osama bin Laden and more prominently Ayman al-Zawahiri, current leader of al Qaeda.

On 6 February 2015, Adel Abdel Bari pleaded guilty and was sentenced to 25 years in prison - the plea bargain was described by the judge as generous.

Early life and music career
Abdel Bary grew up in a council house in Maida Vale in West London.

Abdel Bary released a number of recordings online about his own life as a youth in London. In lyrics for earlier releases online going back to 2012, Bary made apparent references to drug use, violence and life on a council estate and talked about the threat of his family being deported to Egypt due to his father's terrorist activity. He also appeared in SBTV Warmup Sessions as Lyricist Jinn presenting two live tracks that talked about his experiences. In later songs however, references to cannabis use stopped in his lyrics to be replaced with more radical tirades against people who choose to spend their money clubbing, drinking and on drugs rather than feeding their families. He was also part of a rap group known as "The Black Triangle".

As a rapper he was known as Lyricist Jinn and L Jinny.

Known tracks by him include "Overdose" (the only one uploaded, now removed, to his  YouTube channel LJinnyVEVO), "Flying High", "Dreamer", "The Beginning", and "Dog Pound." Some of his recordings were reportedly played on BBC Radio 1. As late as 1 December 2013, music featuring L. Jinny was still being released including the track "My Words" featuring L Jinny on the album More True Talk by Logic & Last Resort.

Radicalisation
Abdel-Majed Abdel Bary was radicalised by Muslim groups connected to preacher Anjem Choudary in England. On 1 July 2013, he reportedly announced that he was giving up his musical aspirations for Islam. "I have left everything for the sake of Allah", he said, walking out of his family's home in Maida Vale in Westminster, leaving behind his mother Ragaa and his five siblings.

ISIS activities
In 2013, Bary joined the jihadist opposition forces in Syria fighting the Syrian government of President Bashar al-Assad. In March 2014, he had a run-in with rival Free Syrian Army opposition forces, claiming in a tweet that he was kidnapped and tortured by them. He eventually joined the even more radical Islamic State of Iraq and Syria (ISIS/ISIL). In June 2014, The Sunday Times revealed a threat made by Bary on Twitter saying: "The lions are coming for you soon you filthy kuffs (infidels). Beheadings in your own backyard soon."

In early August 2014, he posted a photograph of himself holding a man's severed head allegedly taken in Raqqa, Syria, the stronghold of ISIL and declared capital for the ISIL self-proclaimed Islamic State. The caption read: "Chillin' with my homie or what's left of him." The Sunday Times and Sunday People listed Bary as a member of a group of four British-born ISIL members that have guarded, tortured, and beheaded foreign hostages in Syria, a group they called "The Beatles" ("John", "George", "Paul", and "Ringo") because of their British accents.

He was suspected of being the "Jihadi John" appearing in the execution video of James Foley. However, a representative of Scotland Yard told Billboard magazine in August 2014 that the man in the video had not definitively been identified. In February 2015, it was confirmed that "Jihadi John" is not Abdel Bary, but actually Mohammed Emwazi, a Kuwaiti-born man in his mid-20s who had left West London to join ISIS.

In 2014, his family home in London was raided by the British police which provoked a strong reaction from him on social media. He wrote on his Twitter account: "They have nothing to do with this, they did not even know where I am. I haven't lived at home for years you pagans." Bary kept an online presence using the name Abu Klashnikov on Twitter, but his account was eventually suspended. Bary also claimed that he and Junaid Hussain were kidnapped, tortured and robbed by members of a rival Islamic terror group.

In July 2015, it was reported that Bary was on the run in Turkey, after having left ISIS. He disguised himself as a refugee and escaped during the ISIS retreat from Tal Abyad in June 2015, Bary shortly returned on Twitter as @LJinnay where he spoke to his former friends and fans, but then deleted it after one week. He has not been heard from since, now being sought by both the British security services and by ISIL executioners, who have recently killed scores of foreign fighters for deserting their ranks, according to British security sources.

As of December 2017, it was reported that Bary was still alive and perhaps wishing to return to Britain. Bary briefly reuploaded videos to his LJinnyVEVO channel in late July 2017, but he is believed to have carried his refugee disguise into Europe. His inactivity on social media may be a result of his attempts to keep a low profile.

On 21 April 2020, he was arrested in Almería, Spain with two other terrorists, in an operation led by the Spanish police and the CNI that knew he had entered Spanish soil illegally in a dinghy.

References

1991 births
English people of Egyptian descent
British Islamists
Islamic State of Iraq and the Levant members from Egypt
Living people
Islamic State of Iraq and the Levant and the United Kingdom